Pridmore is a surname. People with that name include:

 Ben Pridmore (born 1976), British memory sport competitor and accountant
 Jason Pridmore (born 1969), American motorcycle racer
 J. E. O. Pridmore (1867-1940), British-American architect
 Reg Pridmore (born 1939), English motorcycle road racer
 Reggie Pridmore (1886-1918), English field hockey player

See also